Maziar Elhami Varmazani, born June 16, 1981  in Kermanshah is an Iranian karateka. He also won bronze medals in the 2002 and 2012 world karate championships and four medals in the Asian Championships.

He began karate training at age 14 with his first coach, Shahab Soltani, in the Amjadieh Karate Club in Zanjan Province.

Varmazanis participated six times in world championships from 2002 to 2012, and has the record for most appearances in the World Karate Championships.  He was also the Iran karate national team's captain from 2010 to 2012.

Mixed martial arts

After saying goodbye to karate, he entered the world of martial arts.  This year he is fighting for the New Fighting Generation Sports Belt.

Mixed martial arts record

References

External links 
 Ebilgi.karate.gov.tr
 wkf ranking
 Elhami's Instagram-Page

1981 births
Sportspeople from Kermanshah
Living people
Iranian male karateka